The 2016–17 Tahiti Cup (also known as Coupe Tahiti Nui) was the 78th edition of the national cup in Tahitian football. AS Tefana won the title beating AS Temanava in the final, earning the right to represent Tahiti in the 2017-18 Coupe de France.

Participating teams

Ligue 1 (9 teams)

AS Arue
AS Central Sport
AS Dragon
AS Manu-Ura
AS Olympique Mahina
AS Pirae
AS Taiarapu
AS Tefana
AS Vénus

Ligue 2 (7 teams)

AS Aorai
AS Excelsior
AS Jeunes Tahitiens
A.S. Papara
A.S. Papenoo
AS Tamarii Punaruu
A.S. Teva

Ligue 2 Moorea (4 teams)

A.S. Mira
AS Temanava
AS Tiare Hinano
AS Tiare Tahiti

First round

Round of 16

Round of 8

Semifinals

Final

Top scorers

References

Tahiti Cup
Tahiti
Tahiti
Ligue 1
Ligue 1